Ron Davies or Ronald Davies may refer to:
 Ronald Davies (judge) (1904–1996), American judge
 Ron Davies (Tasmanian politician) (1919–1980), Australian politician from Tasmania
 R. E. G. Davies (Ronald Edward George Davies, 1921–2011), English air transport historian
 Ron Davies (photographer) (1921–2013), Welsh photographer
 Ron Davies (Western Australian politician) (1926–2011), Australian Labor politician and opposition leader from Western Australia 
 Ron Davies (footballer, born 1932) (1932–2007), Welsh football defender who played for Cardiff and Southampton
 Ron Davies (footballer, born 1942) (1942–2013), Welsh international football striker who played for Norwich and Southampton
 Ron Davies (songwriter) (1946–2003), American songwriter, brother to Gail Davies
 Ron Davies (Welsh politician) (born 1946), former Welsh and British politician

See also 
 Ronald Davis (disambiguation)